Laerte de Souza Santos (born 2 September 1958) is a Brazilian military, Army General, and Chief of the Joint Staff of the Armed Forces. Santos became commander on 31 May 2021, replacing Raul Botelho.

Career
Santos started his military career on 4 March 1974, at the Army Cadet Preparatory School, and later the Agulhas Negras Military Academy. He was declared an aspiring officer on 15 December 1980. On 31 March 2018, Santos reached the last post of his military career, as Army General.

References

People from Rio de Janeiro (city)
Brazilian military personnel
1958 births
Living people
Brazilian generals